Elections were held in the Australian state of Victoria on Saturday 4 June 1925 to elect 17 of the 34 members of the state's Legislative Council. MLC were elected using preferential voting.

Results

Legislative Council

|}

Retiring Members

Nationalist
Austin Austin MLC (South Western)
Sir Arthur Robinson MLC (Melbourne South)

Candidates
Sitting members are shown in bold text. Successful candidates are highlighted in the relevant colour. Where there is possible confusion, an asterisk (*) is also used.

See also
1924 Victorian state election

References

1925 elections in Australia
Elections in Victoria (Australia)
1920s in Victoria (Australia)
June 1925 events